Vigneron may refer to:

 Allen Henry Vigneron, archbishop of the Roman Catholic Church in Detroit, Michigan
 André Vigneron, bowed string instrument maker
 Joseph Arthur Vigneron, French archetier and bowmaker
 Marcel Vigneron, American chef
 Pascal Vigneron, French organist and trumpeter
 Thierry Vigneron, retired French athlete
 Vigneron (bow makers), family of French bow makers
 Vigneron submachine gun a submachine gun manufactured in Belgium during the 1950s
 Vigneron, the process of wine production